General Berthelot (Fărcădinul de Jos until 1923, Berthelot between 1923 and 1964, Unirea between 1965 and 2001;) is a commune in Hunedoara County, Transylvania, Romania. It is composed of five villages: Crăguiș (Kraguis), Fărcădin (Felsőfarkadin), General Berthelot, Livezi (Gauricsa) and Tuștea (Tustya).

In 1923 and again in 2001, the commune was named after Henri Mathias Berthelot - who was rewarded by King Ferdinand for his role during World War I with properties in the village confiscated from the Nopcsa family.

References

Communes in Hunedoara County
Localities in Transylvania
Țara Hațegului